Drew School is an independent, coeducational, college-preparatory high school located in San Francisco, California, United States. The school was founded and named in 1908 by John Sheehan Drew and today serves grades 9–12.

History

Founded initially in 1908 as a single-student "coaching school" by Bay Area educator John Sheehan Drew, the school moved to its present location at California St. and Broderick St. in 1911. It underwent a complete renovation in 2001, designed by Perkins + Will; while also adding a  attached performing arts wing known as the Cuddeback Wing, after Samuel Cuddeback III, who was head of school. The Cuddeback Wing was designed in 2011, and features a noted living wall designed by Patrick Blanc.

Drew School is accredited by the National Association of Independent Schools, the California Association of Independent Schools and the Western Association of Schools and Colleges.

Athletic achievements
2022 NCS Class A Championship, Track and Field - 100M, 200M 
2022 BAC Championships, Track and Field - 100M, 200M 
2018 BCL League Championship, Boys Varsity Soccer
2017 BCL League Championship, Girls Varsity Soccer
2016 NCS Sectional Championship, Boys Varsity Soccer
2016 NCS Sectional Championship, Girls Varsity Soccer
2016 BCL League Championship, Girls Soccer

Fall sports
Boys' soccer
Girls' tennis
Girls' volleyball
Boys' cross-country
Girls' cross-country

Winter sports
Boys' basketball
Girls' basketball
Girls' soccer

Spring sports
Baseball
Swimming
Track and field
Badminton
Boys' tennis
Girls' Lacrosse
Golf (Co-ed)

Notable alumni
Alexander Massialas (class of 2012), Olympic fencer
Eric Rachmany (2002), lead singer of Rebelution
Mohammad Javad Zarif (1977), Iranian Minister of Foreign Affairs.
Alexander Wang, fashion designer
Tyson Vogel (1999), musician, band member of Two Gallants
Anne Lamott, writer

See also
San Francisco County high schools

References

High schools in San Francisco
Private preparatory schools in California
Educational institutions established in 1908
1908 establishments in California